Vuforia is an augmented reality software development kit (SDK) for mobile devices that enables the creation of augmented reality applications. It uses computer vision technology to recognize and track planar images and 3D objects in real time. This image registration capability enables developers to position and orient virtual objects, such as 3D models and other media, in relation to real world objects when they are viewed through the camera of a mobile device. The virtual object then tracks the position and orientation of the image in real-time so that the viewer's perspective on the object corresponds with the perspective on the target. It thus appears that the virtual object is a part of the real-world scene.

The Vuforia SDK supports a variety of 2D and 3D target types including ‘markerless’ Image Targets, 3D Model Target, and a form of addressable Fiducial Marker, known as a VuMark. Additional features of the SDK include 6 degrees of freedom device localization in space, localized Occlusion Detection using ‘Virtual Buttons’, runtime image target selection, and the ability to create and reconfigure target sets programmatically at runtime.

Vuforia provides Application Programming Interfaces (API) in C++, Java, Objective-C++, and the .NET languages through an extension to the Unity game engine. In this way, the SDK supports both native development for iOS, Android, and UWP while it also enables the development of AR applications in Unity that are easily portable to both platforms. 

Vuforia has been acquired by PTC Inc. in November 2015.

References

Augmented reality applications
Software development kits